Heinrich Bernhard Friedrich Alexander Georg Hax (27 December 1870 – 1 August 1952) was a German water polo player. He competed in the men's tournament at the 1900 Summer Olympics. Hax was also the chairman and president of the Deutscher Schwimm-Verband, from 1894 to 1903, and 1930 to 1936 respectively.

See also
 Germany men's Olympic water polo team records and statistics
 List of men's Olympic water polo tournament goalkeepers

References

External links
 

1870 births
1952 deaths
German male water polo players
Water polo goalkeepers
Olympic water polo players of Germany
Water polo players at the 1900 Summer Olympics
Water polo players from Berlin
Gymnasts at the 1906 Intercalated Games
German male artistic gymnasts